Georgette Tissier (1910–1959) was a French actress. She was the wife of the actor Jean Tissier.

Selected filmography
 Metropolitan (1939)
 The Black Cavalier (1945)
 The Eleventh Hour Guest (1945)
 The Bread Peddler (1950)

References

Bibliography
 Yves Desrichard. Henri Decoin. Durante, 2003.

External links

1910 births
1959 deaths
French stage actresses
French film actresses
Actresses from Paris
20th-century French actresses